The Journal of Rehabilitation in Civil Engineering is a quarterly peer-reviewed open-access scientific journal published by Semnan University and the editor-in-chief is Ali Kheyroddin (Semnan University). The journal covers all aspects of rehabilitation engineering. It was established in 2012 and is indexed and abstracted in Scopus.

References

External links

Publications established in 2012
Civil engineering journals
Quarterly journals
English-language journals